Colus islandicus is a species of sea snail, a marine gastropod mollusk in the family Colidae, the true whelks and the like.

Subspecies
 Colus islandicus islandicus (Mohr, 1786)
 Colus islandicus subangulosus Paulmier, 2020

Description
 The length of the shell attains 135 mm.

Distribution
Distribution range of this marine species: 77°N to 36.8°N; 92°W to 0°W.

Distribution: 
 Greenland; Greenland: West Greenland, East Greenland; 
 Canada; Canada: Baffin Island, Gulf of St. Lawrence, Quebec; 
 USA: Massachusetts, New York, Virginia

References

 Brunel, P., Bosse, L. & Lamarche, G. (1998). Catalogue of the marine invertebrates of the estuary and Gulf of St. Lawrence. Canadian Special Publication of Fisheries and Aquatic Sciences, 126. 405 pp.
 Hayward, P.J.; Ryland, J.S. (Ed.). (1990). The marine fauna of the British Isles and North-West Europe: 1. Introduction and protozoans to arthropods. Clarendon Press: Oxford, UK. ISBN 0-19-857356-1. 627 pp.

External links
 Mohr, N. (1786). Forsog til en Islandsk Naturhistorie, med adskillige oekonomiske samt andre Anmaerkninger. C.F. Holm, Kobenhavn (Copenhagen) 414pp., pls. 1-7.
 Sowerby, G. B. II. (1880). Monograph of the genus Fusus. In G. B. Sowerby II (ed.), Thesaurus conchyliorum, or monographs of genera of shells. Vol. 4 (35-36): 69–97, pl. 406–417bis. London
 Chemnitz, J. H. (1780-1795). Neues systematisches Conchylien Cabinet. Gabriel Nicolaus Raspe, Nürnberg. Vol. 4
 Locard A. (1896) Mollusques testacés et brachiopodes, pp. 129-242, pl. 5-6, in: Koehler R. (1896) Résultats scientifiques de le campagne du "Caudan" dans le Golfe de Gascogne. Annales de l'Université de Lyon, 26
 Middendorff T. A. von. (1849). Beiträge zur einer Malacozoologica Rossica, II. Aufzählung und Beschreibung der zur Meeresfauna Russlands gehörigen Einschaler. Mémoires de l'Académie Impériale des Sciences de St-Petersbourg, sixième série, Sciences naturelles. 6: 329-516, pl. 1-11.
 Gofas, S.; Le Renard, J.; Bouchet, P. (2001). Mollusca. in: Costello, M.J. et al. (eds), European Register of Marine Species: a check-list of the marine species in Europe and a bibliography of guides to their identification. Patrimoines Naturels. 50: 180-213.
  Trott, T. J. (2004). Cobscook Bay inventory: a historical checklist of marine invertebrates spanning 162 years. Northeastern Naturalist. 11, 261-324

Colidae
Gastropods described in 1786